Venom (also known as The Reaper) is a 2005 American horror film directed by Jim Gillespie and starring Agnes Bruckner, Jonathan Jackson, Laura Ramsey, Meagan Good, D. J. Cotrona and Method Man. It is the final film by Dimension Films to be released during their Miramax tenure before The Walt Disney Company, Miramax's parent company at the time, sold Dimension to The Weinstein Company (TWC) on October 1, 2005.

Plot

A Creole woman digs up a briefcase and drives off. Meanwhile, high school senior Eden and her friends, Rachel, CeCe, Ricky, Patty, Tammy, Eric, and Sean are hanging out at the local burger joint. Sean's father and local tow truck driver, Ray Sawyer, comes by to pick up an order, leading Rachel to comment on how scary he is while Tammy flashes him. After work, Eden and Eric walk home just as Ray drives up and asks if she's alright. When he is sure, he begins to leave when the Creole woman – CeCe's grandmother – passes by. She swerves to avoid Ray and nearly falls off the bridge. Ray saves her, but the woman begs him to get the suitcase. As he reaches for it, the car falls off of the bridge and starts sinking into the water below. Upon suddenly opening, several snakes emerge and attack Ray. The ambulance arrives to find Ray and CeCe's grandmother dead. CeCe arrives shaken up over the tragedy, and takes a charm that was on her grandmother's corpse. CeCe then surprises Eden and Eric by asking them about Ray.

Later that night, the coroner examines Ray's body, noting several snake bites. Suddenly, Ray gets back up and kills the coroner before leaving to retrieve his truck. The next day, Eden visits her father's grave, and sees Ray's tow truck driving by. While swimming in the lake, a heavily drunk Sean ditches Rachel, forcing Eric to chase after him. Meanwhile, Tammy and Patty are planning to go shoplifting, but stop by Ray's business to fix their car first. Once Tammy's done, she goes to look for Patty, only to find her hanging by several chains. She tries to escape, but Ray lowers a car on her and sandblasts her to death.

As Eric follows Sean to Ray's garage, the latter gets angry at the former for abandoning him. He finds a picture of him when he was a little kid, which shows that Ray did care about him, but he storms out toward the garage and finds Tammy's remains. Later that night, Eden and her friends go to CeCe's grandmother's house, where CeCe explains that the snakes that killed Ray were full of evil that her grandmother took out of men to purify their souls. They try to escape, but their car has been flipped over. They see Ray and begin to run, but the undead killer pins Ricky with a crowbar and rips his arm off. Ray goes to enter the house, but finds he can't because it was blessed with voodoo spells. Despite this, he's able to throw a chain inside, drag Sean out, and mortally wound him. Eden and Eric shoot Ray with a rifle so the others can drag Sean inside and try to save him, but he dies on the floor. Rachel mourns the loss of her boyfriend while Eden talks CeCe into turning Sean's body into a human voodoo doll to control Ray. Meanwhile, Ray uses his tow truck on the house's foundation and pulls a whole room off; dragging Eric and Rachel with it and crushing CeCe's leg with a support beam.

Ray begins to climb the wreckage toward CeCe, but she stabs Sean's body several times to slow Ray down. Ultimately however, the possessed killer reaches her and kills her. Eden, Eric, and Rachel try to escape, but Ray follows in his truck and manages to drag Rachel halfway out of the car. Despite Eden's best efforts, Rachel's impaled on a fallen tree. Stuck in the swamp, Eden and Eric try to reach dry land while Ray dives beneath the murky water only to find a copy of Unicorn Island. Soon enough, Ray attacks them and causes them to separate; causing Eden to end up in a crypt with Ray's victims. When she goes to escape, Ray locks her in. Fearing his return, she hides underneath Patty's body just as Ray returns and throws Eric in. She initially believes he's dead, but when he opens his eyes, her surprised gasp alerts Ray. Eric sacrifices himself to protect Eden before she fights back using a charm CeCe gave her. Ray appears to submit, but the snakes possessing him attack her. However, she's able to evade them and use Ray's truck to finally kill him. As she staggers off, two snakes emerge from Ray's body in search of a new host.

Cast
 Agnes Bruckner as Eden Sinclair
 Jonathan Jackson as Eric
 Laura Ramsey as Rachel
 Meagan Good as CeCe
 D. J. Cotrona as Sean
 Pawel Szajda as Ricky
 Rick Cramer as Ray Sawyer
 Bijou Phillips as Tammy
 Davetta Sherwood as Patty
 Method Man as Deputy Turner
 Stacey Travis as Laura Sinclair

Production
The film marked the re-teaming of Kevin Williamson, writer of Scream, and director Jim Gillespie, who previously helmed Williamson's script for I Know What You Did Last Summer. The film is based on Backwater, an unproduced survival-horror video game designed by John Zuur Platten and Flint Dille. It was shot in Louisiana, in the cities of Amite, Choctaw, Hammond, and New Orleans.

Release

Box office

Venom was released in September 2005, several days after Hurricane Katrina devastated much of Southeast Louisiana, making the film seem unfortunately topical.

Reception
Venom garnered negative reviews from critics. The site's critical consensus reads, "A voodoo horror flick without the mojo, Venom is chock full of gory impalings of interchangeable teenage girls and hunky guys by an unstoppable zombie whose unimaginative rampage quickly lulls us to sleep." On Metacritic, which assigns a normalized rating to reviews, the film has a weighted average score of 25 out of 100, based on 21 reviews, indicating "Generally unfavorable reviews".

Kevin Thomas of the Los Angeles Times wrote that Gillespie "smartly directed" a script that follows in the "stylish, energetic and darkly amusing horror movie tradition." Anita Gates of The New York Times wrote that the film "certainly can't be called a good movie, but within its genre it's perfectly palatable." Sean Axmaker of the Seattle Post-Intelligencer praised the film, noting: "Venom delivers everything a teen horror audience could ask for in a brisk 85 minutes."

Kyle Smith of the New York Post wrote, "Even the undemanding high schoolers the film is aimed at will experience déjà voodoo, as Venom recites the A through Z of horror clichés. All hopes for suspense and plot twists are snuffed out about as quickly as the film's black characters." Peter Hartlaub of the San Francisco Chronicle wrote: "Venom is a bad horror film, made worse by the fact that it takes place entirely in Louisiana. Although there isn't a hurricane or even much rain in the film, it's hard to get past the truth -- right about now, people who live in the bayou would probably consider a crazy guy running around with a crowbar a welcome alternative to the reality of the past two weeks." Paul Schrodt of Slant Magazine felt the film paled in comparison to The Skeleton Key, calling it "another lifeless (but peculiarly racist) Deep South horror movie" with "mostly unimaginative" deaths and set pieces.

Johnny Butane of Dread Central gave note of the film's "paper thin" story and characters, "over the top" acting and quick dismissal of the killer, but felt it was "a pretty decent slasher movie," concluding that: "Hopefully it'll find its audience on DVD, as I'm sure is Dimension's plan anyway; but if you get a chance to see it in theaters, give it a go. Don't go in with high expectations, and you might enjoy yourself!" Scott Weinberg of DVD Talk wrote of the film, "Ultimately, Venom is too darn familiar to become anyone's dark-horse favorite, and the screenplay is more bland and familiar than it is outright terrible, but I'd say it's worthy of a rental if you love the horror stuff. You probably won't adore the thing, but you'll most likely admire its nasty tenacity."

In 2014, the film ranked at number 61 on a list of the 100 Greatest Slasher Movies on the genre website Vegan Voorhees.

See also
 List of killer snake films

References

External links
 
 
 
 

2005 films
2005 horror films
2005 psychological thriller films
2000s American films
2000s English-language films
2000s slasher films
American horror thriller films
American monster movies
American slasher films
American supernatural horror films
Dimension Films films
Films about snakes
Films directed by Jim Gillespie (director)
Films scored by James L. Venable
Films set in Louisiana
Films shot in Louisiana
Films shot in New Orleans
Southern Gothic films
Supernatural slasher films